Shaoshan is a county-level city in Hunan Province, China. It is under the administration of the prefecture-level city of Xiangtan. Qingxi Town is its seat.

Located on the mid-eastern Hunan and the mid-north of Xiangtan, Shaoshan is bordered by Ningxiang County to the north, Xiangxiang City to the west and southwest, Xiangtan County to the east and southeast. It is the smallest administrative unit by size or by population in the counties and county-level cities in Hunan province.

As the birthplace of Mao Zedong, the founder of the People's Republic of China, Shaoshan was an important base during the Chinese Communist Revolution. It is also the birthplace of Mao's Family Restaurant, a restaurant chain that has spread to many other cities. Mao remains a popular figure in the area, and red tourism to Shaoshan and other places related to China's communist background has driven the local economy, while increasing people's understanding of China's revolutionary history.

History
Shaoshan's founding legend involves Emperor Shun, who supposedly passed through the site during his southward inspection. He was so fascinated with the landscape that he played the Music of Shao, which summoned many phoenixes and other birds to accompany him. Thus was Shaoshan named for the Music of Shao. It was under the jurisdiction of the state of Chu in the ancient times.

On December 26, 1990, Shaoshan became a county-level city approved by the State Council.

Names and administrative levels of Shaoshan:
 1652 (Qing Dynasty): Qidu, Xiangtan District
 1912 (Republic of China): The Second District, Xi Township, Xiangtan County
 December 1932: The Ninth District, Xiangtan County
 1947: Qingtian Township, Xiangtan County
 January 1950 (People's Republic of China): The Third District, Xiangtan County
 1951: The Fourth District, Xiangtan County
 August 1, 1955: Yintian District, Xiangtan County
 1956: Yintian Town, Xiangtan County
 September 1, 1958: Shaoshan People's Commune, Xiangtan County
 May 12, 1961: Shaoshan District, Xiangtan County
 December 1968: county-controlled district status upgraded to regional district, controlled directly by the province
 December 1981: reverted to be county-controlled
 December 1984: upgraded to county-class district, controlled by Xiangtan City
 December 26, 1990: Upgraded to county-class city, controlled by Xiangtan City on behalf of the province.

Administrative divisions
After an adjustment of subdistrict divisions of Shaoshan City on 16 November 2015, Shaoshan City has two towns and two townships under its jurisdiction. they are:
2 towns
 Qingxi, Shaoshan: Yongyi, Ruyi and the former Qingxi merged
 Yintian, Shaoshan
2 townships
 Shaoshan Township: Daping and the former Shaoshan Township merged
 Yanglin, Shaoshan

Description
Population: the city consists of 100,000 residents, of which 16,000 are non-farmers.

Geography: in the east-central hilly region of Hunan province, the geographical coordinates are longitude 112 ° 23'52 "-112 ° 38'13", latitude 27 ° 51'40 "-28 ° 1'53".

Shaoshan's topography is dominated by Mt. Shaofeng and the Shao and Shishi Rivers, with hills in the west giving rise to a mix of hills and plains in the east. The peak of Mount Shaofeng, 518.5 m above sea level, is the highest point whereas Liumuzhou, 48 m above sea level, is the lowest point of the whole city.

Sister cities
 Vidnoye, Moscow Oblast, Russia

Geography

Climate

References

External links
 Official site 
 Early Pictures of Mao ZeDong in Shaoshan

 
Cities in Hunan
Tourist attractions in Hunan
County-level divisions of Xiangtan